The 1962 Cache Valley earthquake was a magnitude  earthquake that occurred on Thursday, 30 August 1962 at approximately 6:35 AM MT north of Richmond, Utah, United States, at the border between Utah and Idaho. No people were killed in the quake. The quake caused between US $1–2 million in damages.

Earthquake
The 1962 Cache Valley earthquake occurred on Thursday, 30 August 1962 at 6:35 AM MT at the border of Utah and Idaho, north of Richmond, Utah in the United States. In addition to Utah and Idaho, the quake was felt in Colorado, Montana, Nevada, and Wyoming.

Magnitude and intensity
There is disagreement on the size of this earthquake. At least one news outlet stated the University of Utah recorded the quake as being a magnitude . The Mercalli intensity was reported as VII (Very Strong).

Destruction
Property damages were estimated between US$1–2 million (US$8.5–17 million in 2020). At the time of the quake, it was the most costly in the history of Utah. Most of the damage was in Richmond, but the nearby towns of Logan, Franklin, Lewiston, and Preston also had some damage.

The building with the most significant damage was the LDS Benson Stake Tabernacle in Richmond, which was eventually torn down due to the extensive structural issues caused by the quake. Several older houses also had to be torn down due to the damage received. There was extensive damage to North Cache High School, headstones in the cemetery were knocked over, and many houses had collapsed chimneys and masonry, broken windows, and cracked walls. The high school had to be closed for repairs.

No people were killed in the quake. One person was cut on her foot by a broken bottle.

Legacy
A commemorative event was held in Richmond on 30 August 2012.

References

1962 in Utah
1962 earthquakes
1962 natural disasters in the United States
Earthquakes in Utah